The Millennium Cup was a professional invitational snooker tournament, which took place from 23 to 25 July 1999. The tournament was played at the Regent Hotel in Hong Kong, and featured eight players.

Stephen Lee won the second title of his professional career, beating Ronnie O'Sullivan 7–2 in the final after taking a 5–0 lead. Lee received £50,000 as winner.

Main draw
Results were as follows.

Final

Century breaks

131  Stephen Hendry
104  Ronnie O'Sullivan

References

1999 in snooker
Snooker non-ranking competitions